The Journal of Inorganic Biochemistry is a monthly peer-reviewed scientific journal covering research on the inorganic aspects of biochemistry, such as metalloenzymes and metallobiomolecules. The journal was established in 1971 as Bioinorganic Chemistry, obtaining its current name in 1979. Since 1996, the editor-in-chief has been John H. Dawson (University of South Carolina).

According to the Journal Citation Reports, the journal has a 2020 impact factor of 4.155, ranking it 7th out of 44 journals in the category "Chemistry, Inorganic and Nuclear".

References

External links 
 

Biochemistry journals
Elsevier academic journals
Monthly journals
Publications established in 1971
Inorganic chemistry journals
English-language journals